Michael Manning Weatherly Jr. (born July 8, 1968) is an American actor, producer, director, and musician, known for playing the roles of Anthony DiNozzo in the television series NCIS (2003–2016) and Logan Cale in Dark Angel (2000–2002). From 2016 to 2022, he starred as Dr. Jason Bull in Bull, a courtroom drama. He also starred in Meet Wally Sparks.

Early life 
Weatherly was born in New York and raised in Fairfield, Connecticut.  His parents are Patricia (née Hetherington) and Michael Weatherly. Weatherly is of Irish descent.

Weatherly attended Fairfield Country Day School and graduated from Brooks School in North Andover, Massachusetts. He attended Boston University, Menlo College, American University, and The American University of Paris but left college to pursue acting.

Career 
Weatherly began his acting career with a minor television role on The Cosby Show as Theo Huxtable's roommate. He played the role of Cooper Alden in Loving and later, The City, appearing in the role from 1992 until 1996.

Weatherly moved to Los Angeles, soon landing a role as a series regular on the FOX television series Significant Others with Jennifer Garner, though the show only lasted six episodes. He then met director Whit Stillman who cast him in the 1998 film The Last Days of Disco as Hap, opposite Chloë Sevigny. Weatherly also appeared as a conflicted warlock in the series Charmed during its first season in 1998.

His movie credits include Meet Wally Sparks (1997) with Rodney Dangerfield, Gun Shy (2000) with Liam Neeson, Cabin by the Lake (2000) with Judd Nelson, and the independent film Trigger Happy opposite Rosario Dawson.

Weatherly starred in Dark Angel for the two seasons it was on the air. This role earned him three award nominations, two Saturn Awards for best supporting actor on television in 2001 and 2002, and one Teen Choice award for choice actor in 2001.

In 2003 he appeared as Senior NCIS Special Agent Anthony DiNozzo in two episodes of the CBS series JAG, a role he continued to portray in the spin-off series NCIS.  He made subsequent guest appearances on both NCIS: New Orleans (2014) and NCIS: Los Angeles (2015). Together with Pauley Perrette, who played Abby Sciuto, he is one of only two actors who have appeared in all four shows (JAG, NCIS, NCIS: LA, NCIS: NO). In 2004 he starred in the television film The Mystery of Natalie Wood, portraying Robert Wagner. Since 2010, Robert Wagner had made twelve guest appearances on NCIS as Anthony DiNozzo Sr., the father of Weatherly's character.

He was a guest presenter at the Australian Logie Awards of 2007 on May 6, 2007, and was a guest on Rove Live.

Weatherly made his directing debut with the season-eight episode of NCIS titled "One Last Score", which aired March 1, 2011, and also directed the NCIS season-10 episode "Seek" which aired March 19, 2013.

He portrayed Jesus Christ in a YouTube video that also featured comedian Sarah Silverman and was sponsored by a pro-choice organization. In 2015, Weatherly participated in the #Tapped challenge by posting a video of himself dancing to raise money for Broadway Cares/Equity Fights AIDS.

CBS announced in January 2016 that Weatherly would be leaving NCIS after 13 seasons of starring as main character Anthony DiNozzo. At the same time, the network announced he would star in a new series called Bull in fall 2016, loosely based on the real-life trial consultancy of Dr. Phil McGraw.

Weatherly was a presenter at the 68th Primetime Emmy Awards in 2016, and the 40th People's Choice Awards in 2014. He has appeared on numerous talk shows including The Rachel Ray Show, CBS This Morning, Live with Kelly and Ryan, the Today Show, the Late Show, and The Late Late Show with James Corden.

Directing 
Weatherly has directed numerous short films, and television episodes from the series NCIS and Bull. He directed the 2017 documentary Jamaica Man, about the life of British expatriate Nigel Pemberton, which premiered at the 2017 Telluride Film Festival. Jamaica Man won "Best Documentary Portrait" at the 2017 Doc LA - Los Angeles Documentary Film Festival, and "Best Documentary" at the 2018 NYC Independent Film Festival. The film was also screened at the 2018 Tiburon International Film Festival and TMFF festival.

Music 
Weatherly sings and plays several instruments, including piano and guitar. He has written several songs, including two songs from the NCIS soundtracks, "Bitter and Blue" and "Under the Sun". He played in a band and performed music on his own while pursuing his early career in New York City. Another early project was a video shoot for a karaoke CD: A Taste of Honey's version of "Sukiyaki".

Personal life 
Weatherly married his Loving/The City co-star Amelia Heinle in February 1995. Their son, was born in 1996. They divorced in 1997.

During filming of Dark Angel in January 2000, Weatherly began a relationship with co-star Jessica Alba, leading to their engagement in 2001. The relationship ended in August 2003.

Weatherly married Serbian internist Dr. Bojana Janković on September 30, 2009. The couple live in Manhattan with their two children: a daughter and a son.

Weatherly is the uncle of actress Alexandra Breckenridge.

Sexual harassment 
In January 2018, CBS settled for $9.5 million with actress Eliza Dushku after she was fired from a recurring role on Bull after informing producers of Weatherly's inappropriate behavior on the set. According to documents from the official mediation, Weatherly was recorded on video making comments about spanking Dushku over his knee, soliciting a threesome, alluding to sexual assault in his "rape van," and other inappropriate remarks. After Dushku spoke with producers, Weatherly texted CBS Television Studios' president David Stapf saying he wanted to talk about Dushku's sense of humor, though Stapf pushed back saying "Ms. Dushku made the show better." Days later, showrunner Glenn Caron terminated her expected role on the show despite opposition from studio executives.

In November 2021 Dushku testified in front of the House Judiciary Committee about her sexual harassment accusations during her time on Bull. She said in her testimony: "In 2017, I was aggressively pursued by CBS to become a co-lead in a show called 'Bull.' I was told that the role would be a six-year commitment to play a smart, strong leading lady — a competent, high-powered lawyer meant to counter balance the existing male lead, and that the role had been written specifically with me in mind. However, in my first week on my new job I found myself the brunt of crude, sexualized and lewd verbal assaults. I suffered near constant sexual harassment from my co-star." Dushku added that Weatherly called her "legs" and talked about his sperm. 

In December 2018 when the settlement was reported, Weatherly publicly apologized for the comments, saying "When Eliza told me that she wasn't comfortable with my language and attempt at humor, I was mortified to have offended her and immediately apologized." Dushku responded that Weatherly broke the terms of their settlement by speaking to the press and characterized his apology as "more deflection, denial, and spin." Pauley Perrette and Sasha Alexander, Weatherly's co-stars from NCIS, tweeted in support of him following the accusations. In August 2019, it was reported that both Weatherly and Caron were undergoing leadership training following the settlement.

Philanthropy 
Weatherly and his wife are involved with nonprofit organizations such as the Tryall Fund, which focuses on improving education and public health in Hanover Parish, Jamaica. They are also involved with Environmental Working Group, an organization focused on environmental consciousness, and Healthy Child Healthy World, a children's health initiative.

Filmography

Film

Television

Discography

Awards and nominations 
Saturn Awards

 2001: Nominated, "Best Supporting Actor in a Television Series" – Dark Angel
 2002: Nominated, "Best Supporting Actor in a Television Series" – Dark Angel

Soap Opera Digest Awards

 1994: Nominated, "Hottest Male Star" – Loving
 1995: Nominated, "Outstanding Younger Lead Actor" – Loving

Teen Choice Awards

 2001: Nominated, "Choice TV Actor" – Dark Angel

Doc LA - Los Angeles Documentary Film Festival

 2017: Won, "Best Documentary Portrait" – Jamaica Man

References

External links

 Official Michael Weatherly website

 
 Michael Weatherly at  Hollywood.com
 Profile on CBS

1968 births
20th-century American male actors
21st-century American male actors
Actors from Fairfield, Connecticut
American male film actors
American male television actors
American people of Irish descent
American University of Paris alumni
American University alumni
Boston University alumni
Brooks School alumni
Living people
Male actors from New York City
Menlo College alumni
People from Manhattan